Hala Sportowa Częstochowa is a sport, show and fair arena in Częstochowa, Poland. In sport it is primarily used for volleyball, and also concerts. The arena was officially opened on September 29, 2012, during the SuperCup 2012 volleyball match – PGE Skra Bełchatów vs Asseco Resovia Rzeszów. Occasionally it is a place of playing matches of FIVB Volleyball World League.

Notes

External links

 Official site of Hala Sportowa Częstochowa

AZS Częstochowa
Indoor arenas in Poland
Buildings and structures in Częstochowa
Sports venues in Silesian Voivodeship
Volleyball venues in Poland
Sport in Częstochowa
Boxing venues in Poland
Mixed martial arts venues in Poland